Tabekenamun (Tabakenamun)  was a Nubian queen dated to the Twenty-fifth Dynasty of Egypt.

Tabekenamun was a daughter of King Piye and may have been a queen consort to her brother Taharqa. She is known from Cairo Statue 49157 from Karnak.

Others have suggested Tabekenamun was the wife of Shabaka. She was a King's Daughter, King's Sister and King's Wife. In addition, she was a priestess of Hathor, Mistress of Tepihu (Aphroditopolis) and a priestess of Hathor of Iunyt (Dendera) as well as a priestess of Neith. The priestly offices could suggest she was a daughter of one of the Libyan Pharaohs.

References

8th-century BC Egyptian women
7th-century BC Egyptian women
Queens consort of the Twenty-fifth Dynasty of Egypt
Ancient Egyptian priestesses
8th-century BC clergy
7th-century BC clergy
Taharqa
8th-century BC Egyptian people
7th-century BC Egyptian people
Hathor